Vicol Calabiciov is a retired Romanian sprint canoeist who competed in the late 1960s and early 1970s. He won two medals at the ICF Canoe Sprint World Championships with a gold (C-2 1000 m: 1966) and a bronze (C-2 10000 m: 1971).

References

Living people
Romanian male canoeists
Year of birth missing (living people)
ICF Canoe Sprint World Championships medalists in Canadian